Berge may refer to:

Places
Berge (Thrace) an Athenian colony in Thrace, north of Amphipolis
Berge, Teruel, a municipality in Teruel Province, Aragon, Spain
in Germany:
Berge, Brandenburg, a municipality in the district of Prignitz, in Brandenburg
Berge, Lower Saxony, a municipality in the district of Osnabrück, in Lower Saxony
Berge, Saxony-Anhalt, a locality in the town Gardelegen, Altmarkkreis Salzwedel, in Saxony-Anhalt

Surname
Berge (surname)

See also
Burj (disambiguation)
Burg (disambiguation)
Berg (disambiguation)